Directo En Tus Manos is the first live album released by Venezuelan singer-songwriter Carlos Baute. The album was released by Warner Music on September 8, 2009. It was filmed on the live show Baute presented on the Palacio de Vistalegre in Madrid on June 25, 2009. The show included guest appearances of Nek, Pastora Soler, Alex Ubago and Marta Sánchez.

Track listing

Charts 
Directo En Tus Manos reached No. 6 in Spain and No. 45 in Mexico.

Release history

References 

2009 albums
Warner Music Group albums
Carlos Baute albums